Narendra Kanwar, or Rajmata, is a politician from the Indian state of Rajasthan. Born in Dhanla, Jodhpur, she started her political career in 1993 when she won the Sawai Madhopur seat as an independent. She supported veteran leader Bhairon Singh Shekhawat in his government formation and became the Minister of State for Tourism, Art and Culture, Archaeology, and Women and Child Welfare. Kanwar was the first female member of Rajasthani Royal Rajput Family to become a minister when, as an independent, she defeated Yasmin Abrar, the wife of then Union Minister Abrar Ahmed. She left politics in the year 2003, but later rejoined in 2007.

References

Women in Rajasthan politics
Living people
Year of birth missing (living people)
Members of the Rajasthan Legislative Assembly
People from Jodhpur district